Kauffenheim is a commune in the Bas-Rhin department in Grand Est in north-eastern France. It lies twenty kilometres (twelve miles) to the east of Haguenau, and a short distance from the A35 autoroute Strasbourg–Landau.

History
The first surviving record of the village dates from 884 and spells the name of the village "Chochinheim".   Subsequently, the name has been written Cochenheim, Chochenheim, Kochenheim and Koechenheim before morphing into Kauffenheim, the current spelling.

Between 1359 and 1680 the village was owned by the aristocratic von Fleckenstein family.

In 1720 it came into the possession of the Rohan-Soubise family, and thus remained until the French Revolution.

Population

See also
 Communes of the Bas-Rhin department

References

Communes of Bas-Rhin
Bas-Rhin communes articles needing translation from French Wikipedia